EMB may refer to:

Organizations 
 EMB Consultancy, an actuarial business consultancy
 Education and Manpower Bureau, now the Education Bureau, a government agency in Hong Kong
 Empire Marketing Board, a former British trade organization
 Evangelical Mennonite Brethren, now the Fellowship of Evangelical Bible Churches
 European Milk Board, a trade organization
 European Movement Belgium, the Belgian branch of the International European Movement
 Evangelische Michaelsbruderschaft, a German Lutheran religious brotherhood

Science and technology 
 Electromagnetic buoyancy
 Embraer, a Brazilian aerospace conglomerate
 Embreea, an orchid genus
 Eosin methylene blue, a selective stain for Gram-negative bacteria
 Ethambutol, a drug used to treat tuberculosis
 Louis Emberger (1897–1969), French botanist

Other uses 
 Embaloh language
 EMB or Embarcadero Plaza, formerly known as Justin Herman Plaza in San Francisco, a hotspot for street skateboarding in the early 1990s.